Dolzhansky (masculine), Dolzhanskaya (feminine), or Dolzhanskoye (neuter) may refer to:
Dolzhansky District, a district of Oryol Oblast, Russia
Dolzhansky (rural locality) (Dolzhanskaya, Dolzhanskoye), name of several rural localities in Russia